Bái is the pinyin of the surname 白, meaning the colour white. 

Another surname, 柏, means the tree cypress. This one is the 37th name on the Hundred Family Surnames poem. Since 柏 is a character with two readings, it is often mistakenly read as "Bó". In modern Chinese, the proper way to pronounce it as a surname is "Bǎi".

Bai and other variants were ranked 79th within the list of common Chinese surnames in 2006, down from 70th in 1990.

Origin
 a surname used by descendants of Bai Fu, a minister of the legendary Emperor Yan.
 a surname used by descendants of Bai Gongsheng, the son of a crown prince of the State of Chu during the Spring and Autumn Period.
 a surname used by the descendants of a prince named Bai, son of Duke Wu of the state of Qin.
 a surname used by descendants of Duke Mu of Qin.
 a surname used by the Mongols, possibly derived from Borjigin.
 a surname used by the Manchus of Irgen Gioro and Bayara Gioro
 during the ancient Tang Dynasty in modern-day Yunnan, the Bai people used the surname Bai after their tribe name 
 a surname used by the ancient Donghu people.
 a surname used by the ancient people of Kucha (or Qiuci). Kucha was an ancient country located in current Xinjiang province of China.

Alternate spellings
 Mandarin: Bái, Pai
 Taiwan: Pai
 Cantonese (Hong Kong and Macao): Baak6, Pak
 Min Nan (Hokkien (Fujian)/Teochew): Pe̍h, Pe̍k, Peh
 Vietnamese: Bạch
 Korean: Paik, Baik, Baek, Baeg (백) based on the same Chinese letter 白 
 Japanese: Bekku, Haku, Hyaku, Byaku

Notable people

 Bai An (白安, 1991-), Taiwanese singer, Manchus
 Bai Chongxi (白崇禧, 1893–1966), Chinese Muslim general of the Republic of China
 Bai Chong'en, 白重恩 Chinese economist
 Pai Hsiao-yen (白曉燕, 1980–1997), Taiwanese teenage idol and victim of a fatal kidnapping
 Pai Hsien-yung (白先勇, 1937-), Chinese Muslim writer
 Bai Jie (白洁, 1972-), Chinese female footballer
 Bai Jing (白静, 1983–2012), Chinese actress
 Bai Juyi (白居易, 772–846), Tang Dynasty poet
 Pai Kun-Hong (白昆弘, 1970-), Taiwanese baseball player
 Bai Ling (白灵, 1966-), Chinese-born American actress
 Bai Qi (白起, died 257 BC), Qin general of the Warring States Period
 Bai Renfu (白仁甫, 1226–1306), Yuan Dynasty playwright
 Bai Shouyi (白寿彝, 1909–2000) (Arabic name: Djamal al-Din Bai Shouyi) Chinese Muslim historian
 Bai Shuxiang (白淑湘, born 1939), Chinese ballet dancer
 Lou Pai (白露龍, 1947-), Chinese-American businessman and former Enron executive
 Bai Wenqi (白文奇, born 1955), Lieutenant general of the PLA Air Force
 Bai Chunli (白春礼, born 1953), Manchus, Chinese physical chemist and nanoscientist, President of the Chinese Academy of Sciences
 Peter Pek, chief executive of the World Branding Forum
 Bai Yansong (白岩松, 1968), Chinese host
 Rose Pak (白蘭; 1947–2016) Chinese-born political activist in San Francisco, California
 Michelle Bai (白冰, 1986) is a Chinese actress and singer
 Bai Jingting (白敬亭, 1993) Chinese Actor

柏
 Bai Jiajun (柏佳骏; 1991) is a Chinese football player
 Bai Wenwei (柏文蔚; 1876–1947), KMT General, Governor of Anhui Province, Advisor to Presidential Palace, Chairman Anhui Provincial Government, KMT Central Party Committee, and Central Executive Committee 
 Bai Xiaolei (柏小磊; 1985-) is a Chinese football player born in Dalian
 Bai Yan (柏衍; 1989-) is a Chinese male tennis player born in Nanjing, Jiangsu
 Penname: Bo Yang (柏楊; 1920 – 2008), was a Taiwanese poet, essayist and historian, real name Guo Dingsheng (郭定生)

拜
 Pai Tzu-li, (拜自立) Chinese Muslim General of the Republic of China

As part of a stagename/pseudonym
 Bai Guang (白光 stagename) (1921–1999), birth name Shi Yongfen (史永芬) movie star and singer

Korean
 Helen Pai, American television writer, director, and producer

See also
 Tommaso Bai or Baj (1636–1714), Italian composer WP:it
 Alfredo Bai (1913–1980), Italian sculptor
 Matt Bai (1968-), American political columnist
 Marcus Bai (1972-), Papua New Guinean rugby league footballer
 Alison Bai (born 1990), Australian tennis player.

Chinese-language surnames
Multiple Chinese surnames

ko:백 (성씨)
ja:白 (朝鮮人の姓)